Jacques Smith (born December 31, 1991) is an American football defensive end and linebacker who is currently a free agent. He played college football at the University of Tennessee from 2010 to 2013, was a member of the Atlanta Falcons' practice squad in 2014.

Early years
Smith was born in Chattanooga, Tennessee, grew up in Ooltewah, Tennessee.  He attended Ooltewah High School and was ranked as the No. 6 weakside defensive end by Rivals.com and the No. 8 defensive end in nation by Scout.com, and the No. 1 prospect in the State of Tennessee by some publications, including the Knoxville News Sentinel and Rivals.com. He was also selected by USA Today as a first-team player on its All-USA high school football team. Smith was also selected to be on the East team of the Arm All-American 2010 team.

College career
Jacques Smith played for the Volunteers 2010-2014. Through his years at the university Jacques achieved Freshman-All SEC honors as well as being slated as member of the teams "Player  Council". Although Jacques experienced minor setbacks during his sophomore season due to injury he still became a full-time starter and an important role player for the Volunteers.

Professional career
Smith was signed by the Atlanta Falcons as an undrafted free agent in May 2014,  He played for the Falcons' practice squad during the 2014 NFL season. On May 1, 2015, Smith was waived by the Falcons.

References

1991 births
Living people
Atlanta Falcons players
Tennessee Volunteers football players
Sportspeople from Chattanooga, Tennessee
People from Ooltewah, Tennessee
Players of American football from Tennessee